The Ninth Seimas of Lithuania was a parliament (Seimas) elected in Lithuania. Elections took place on 10 October 2004, with the run-off on 24 October. The Seimas commenced its work on 15 November 2004 and served a four-year term, with the last session on 16 November 2008.

Elections

In the elections in 2004, 70 members of the parliament were elected on proportional party lists and 71 in single member constituencies. Elections took place on 10 October 2004. Run-off elections were held on 24 October in the single-seat constituencies where no candidate secured a seat in the first round.

Activities

After the elections, Social Democrats led the coalition together with the New Union (Social Liberals), Labor and Peasants and New Democratic Party Union. Artūras Paulauskas was reelected as the Speaker of the Ninth Seimas, having served as the Speaker in the previous term.

In April 2006 the parliament expressed no confidence in the Speaker and Paulauskas was forced to resign, taking New Union out of the coalition. He was replaced as the Speaker of the Seimas by Viktoras Muntianas of Labor Party, who soon left the party to form Civic Democratic Party.

After another disagreement in May 2006, Labor Party joined the opposition. The decision was affected by the decision of the leader of the Party Viktor Uspaskich to resign as the Minister of the Economy after being accused of conflicts of interest. Opposition Liberal and Centre Union joined the minority government that ruled with some support of other opposition parties. At the beginning of 2008 New Union rejoined the coalition. Viktoras Muntianas resigned as the Speaker of the Seimas after a corruption scandal in April 2008 and Česlovas Juršėnas was elected in his stead.

This parliament passed legislation for possible introduction of euro.

Composition

Parliamentary groups

During the first session of the Seimas the following parliamentary groups were registered: Social Democratic Party of Lithuania (LSDPF), Labour Party (DPF), Liberal and Centre (LCSF), Liberal Democrats (LDF), New Union (NSF), Homeland Union (TSF), Peasant and New Democracy (VNDF, later VLF) and the Mixed Group of Members of the Seimas (MSNG).

The term of the Seimas was noted for particularly significant shifts among parliamentary groups. For example, only 20 Social Democrats were elected to the Seimas, but Social Democratic Party political group in the Seimas had 38 members at the end of the term. Parliamentary groups formed during the term included Liberals (LF), Order and Justice Liberal Democrats (TTLDF), Civic Democratic (PDF), as well as Peasant Popular and Civic Democratic (VLPDF) groups.

By the end of the term of the Seimas, the following parliamentary groups were active.

Members
A total of 158 members served on the Ninth Seimas.

References

Legal history of Lithuania
21st century in Lithuania
09